Danley is both a surname and a given name. Notable people with the name include:
Jeremy Danley, alias, "Jer-Dog" or "JerDog" (born 1975), American comedy writer, producer, actor and performer
Christian Danley, American artist, animator, actor, and playwright
Kerwin Danley (born 1961), American baseball umpire
Danley Johnson, former Canadian soccer player

See also
Danley Covered Bridge, bridge in West Finley, Pennsylvania
Danleys Crossroads, Alabama